Hacıbəyli (also, Gadzhybeyli) is a village and municipality in the Barda Rayon of Azerbaijan. It has a population of 369.

References 

Populated places in Barda District